Luis Alberto Ramírez Lucay (born 10 November 1984 in Lima) is a Peruvian footballer who plays for Academia Cantolao.

Honours

Club
Bolognesi
Torneo Clausura: 2007

Corinthians
Campeonato Brasileiro Série A: 2011
Copa Libertadores: 2012

Ponte Preta
Campeonato Paulista do Interior: 2013

Alianza Lima
Torneo Apertura: 2017
 Peruvian First Division (1): 2017

International goals

Statistics

References

External links

1984 births
Living people
Footballers from Lima
Association football midfielders
Peruvian footballers
Peru international footballers
Academia Deportiva Cantolao players
Coronel Bolognesi footballers
Cienciano footballers
Club Universitario de Deportes footballers
Club Libertad footballers
Sport Club Corinthians Paulista players
Club Deportivo Universidad de San Martín de Porres players
Club Alianza Lima footballers
Sport Boys footballers
Associação Atlética Ponte Preta players
Botafogo de Futebol e Regatas players
Campeonato Brasileiro Série A players
Peruvian Primera División players
Paraguayan Primera División players
Peruvian expatriate footballers
Expatriate footballers in Brazil
Expatriate footballers in Paraguay
Peruvian expatriate sportspeople in Paraguay
Peruvian expatriate sportspeople in Brazil